The Queen of the Baths is a 1926 German silent comedy film directed by Victor Janson and starring Mary Nolan, Walter Rilla and Livio Pavanelli.

The film's sets were designed by the art director Jacek Rotmil.

Cast
 Mary Nolan as Micheline Bonnard
 Walter Rilla as Lord Arthur Blythe
 Livio Pavanelli as Marquis
 Camilla von Hollay as Mme. Richemond
 Ida Wüst as Fürstin Wolkonski
 Gertrud Arnold as Lady Blythe
 Ferdinand Hart as Maler Tschakoff
 Lissy Arna as Mannequin
 Eva Speyer as Direktrice
 Alf Blütecher as Gibson
 Paul Morgan as Spieler
 Siegfried Berisch as Spieler
 Oreste Bilancia as Spieler

References

Bibliography
 Grange, William. Cultural Chronicle of the Weimar Republic. Scarecrow Press, 2008.

External links 
 

1926 films
Films of the Weimar Republic
German silent feature films
Films directed by Victor Janson
Films based on German novels
National Film films
German black-and-white films
German comedy films
1926 comedy films
Silent comedy films
1920s German films
1920s German-language films